= Contramandatio placiti =

Ancient English legal phrase

In ancient English law-books, the phrase "contramandatio placiti" signifies a respiting, or giving the defendant more time to answer; or, an imparlance, or countermanding of what was formerly ordered.
